Patrickswell, historically known as Toberpatrick, is a small town in County Limerick, Ireland. It is primarily a commuter village for people working in Limerick, particularly the nearby industrial suburb of Raheen. The population was 847 at the 2016 census.

Etymology
The name refers to Saint Patrick and there is a small hand pump/well in the main street; Microsoft mappoint and some other programs call the village St. Patrick's Well or St. Patrickswell.

Overview
Patrickswell has a main street, with shops, garages, ATMs and a post office. The town is located only 10 km from Limerick city, and as a result relies on the city and its suburbs for secondary schools, shops, banks and other facilities.

There are several housing estates (Marian Park, Lisheen Park, Belgard Grove Sycamore Heights and Laurel Park) off the main street and road to Clarina. The latter road has strip development north from Patrickswell all the way to Clarina and the N69 road.

Location and transport
The town is located near to the N20/N21 road, which until Patrickswell was bypassed in 2001, ran through the town centre. This road is now the R526 from west of the town to Limerick city. The town can be accessed at either end from the N20 junction for Limerick Racecourse, or the N20/N21 junction further west (where the R526 commences).

A railway line to Adare and Foynes passes alongside the town to the south, although Patrickswell station is long closed. The station was at one time Patrickswell Junction, with direct Limerick–Cork trains diverging here from the route of trains bound for Foynes, Newcastle West and Tralee. Freight trains from Limerick to/from Foynes ran until 2000, and technically the line is still open - though not passable all the way to Foynes (a bridge is in need of replacement). The last train was when the weedspray train visited the line on 7 May 2002. An inspection car was the last movement on the line, which travelled the line in January 2003. Passenger trains ceased in 1963, though passenger services to Croom, Bruree and Charleville on the Cork direct line ceased in 1934 finally closing in March 1967 and lifted soon afterwards. In November 1975 the Ballingrane–Tralee (North Kerry) line closed (see Irish railway history). Patrickswell railway station opened on 12 July 1856, closed for passenger traffic on 4 February 1963 and finally closed altogether on 2 December 1974. The signal cabin remained opened until 1982. Patrickswell Railway station is now in private ownership, it is home to Hutch Hollywood Engineers. A contemporary extension to the original railway station building was designed by Rob Shanahan architects and won OPUS Building of the year award in 2004.

Media
Despite the size, Patrickswell exchange was not DSL-enabled till 2007, though this means it is ADSL2+. Some parts can get Digiweb Metro Broadband on 10.5 GHz wireless (needs Line of sight Woodcock Hill). Most homes have good reception of Saorview DTT (much better than analogue TV was), DAB (RTE only) and VHF-FM from Woodcock Hill. MMDS (UPC's Wireless cable TV for Rural areas) is either from Woodcock Hill or a transmitter in Limerick City direction. MMDS is likely to end in 2016. Patrickswell is on Eircom's Fibre Rollout for 2016-17, but this is likely just VDSL from exchange and perhaps a cabinet near Marian Park.

History
The town played a role in the Battle of Killmallock.

According to Mainchín Seoighe, the present day parish of Patrickswell-Ballybrown is made up parts of the pre-Reformation parishes of Kilkeedy, Killonahan, Mungret, Croom, and Adare. Until the middle of the 18th century, the parishes of Kilkeedy and Clounanna were joined with Adare. When the parish of Patrickswell was formed Kilkeedy and Clounanna became part of the new parish. The first parish priest of the new parish was Fr Nicholas Molony. The present population of the parish is roughly 3,400 people.

Politics
Patrickswell is located with the Limerick City West local authority area of Limerick City and County Council & in the Limerick City constituency for national politics

See also
 List of towns and villages in Ireland

References

Towns and villages in County Limerick